Braepark is a suburb of Edinburgh, the capital of Scotland. It is north of the A90.

Sources
(Google Maps)

Areas of Edinburgh